Gilmore is a city in Crittenden County, Arkansas, United States. Per the 2020 census, the population was 176.

Geography
Gilmore is located in northern Crittenden County at  (35.411229, -90.277528). It is bordered to the south by the city of Turrell. 
Interstate 555 (as well as U.S. Routes 61 and 63) pass through the west part of Gilmore, leading northwest  to Jonesboro and south  via Interstate 55 to West Memphis.

Ecologically, Gilmore is located within the Northern Backswamps ecoregion within the larger Mississippi Alluvial Plain. The Northern Backswamps are a network of low-lying overflow areas and floodplains historically dominated by bald cypress, water tupelo, overcup oak, water hickory, and Nuttall oak forest subject to year-round or seasonal inundation. The Wapanocca National Wildlife Refuge, which preserves some of the year-round flooded bald cypress forest typical of this ecoregion prior to development for row agriculture lies southeast of Gilmore.

Demographics

2020 census

Note: the US Census treats Hispanic/Latino as an ethnic category. This table excludes Latinos from the racial categories and assigns them to a separate category. Hispanics/Latinos can be of any race.

2000 Census
As of the census of 2000, there were 292 people, 100 households, and 78 families residing in the town.  The population density was 512.5/km2 (1,306.1/mi2).  There were 114 housing units at an average density of 200.1/km2 (509.9/mi2).  The racial makeup of the town was 19.86% White, 79.11% Black or African American, 0.68% from other races, and 0.34% from two or more races.

There were 100 households, out of which 38.0% had children under the age of 18 living with them, 43.0% were married couples living together, 31.0% had a female householder with no husband present, and 22.0% were non-families. 22.0% of all households were made up of individuals, and 8.0% had someone living alone who was 65 years of age or older.  The average household size was 2.92 and the average family size was 3.38.

In the town the population was spread out, with 35.3% under the age of 18, 9.9% from 18 to 24, 24.3% from 25 to 44, 19.9% from 45 to 64, and 10.6% who were 65 years of age or older.  The median age was 30 years. For every 100 females, there were 105.6 males.  For every 100 females age 18 and over, there were 83.5 males.

The median income for a household in the town was $20,625, and the median income for a family was $22,031. Males had a median income of $29,375 versus $18,000 for females. The per capita income for the town was $8,867.  About 29.1% of families and 38.6% of the population were below the poverty line, including 52.2% of those under the age of eighteen and 44.8% of those 65 or over.

Education
Gilmore is in the Marion School District. Its comprehensive high school is Marion High School.

Gilmore was formerly in the Turrell School District. On July 1, 2010, the former Turrell district consolidated with the Marion School District, thus closing the former Turrell High School.

References

External links

Cities in Crittenden County, Arkansas
Cities in Arkansas
Memphis metropolitan area